BcIII is a polypeptide sea anemone neurotoxin isolated from Bunodosoma caissarum. It targets the site 3 of voltage-gated sodium channels, thus mainly prolonging the inactivation time course of the channel.

Sources 
BcIII can be isolated from the venom of the sea anemone Bunodosoma caissarum.

Chemistry 
BcIII belongs to Type 1 sea anemone neurotoxins, which target the α-subunits of voltage-gated sodium channels (Nav1.x). It has 48 amino acids and a molecular mass of 4.976 atomic mass units. The secondary structure of BcIII consists of 4.0% α-helixes, 43.4% β-strands, 21.3% β-turns and 31.3% is unordered. The three-dimensional structure of BcIII can be found on SWISS-MODEL.

Figure 1: The amino acid sequence of BcIII.

Target 
BcIII binds to voltage-gated sodium channels on site 3, which is the extracellular loop connecting the segments S3 and S4 (the voltage sensor segment) of domain IV. BcIII has the biggest effect on Nav1.1 and Nav1.5 (Table 1). However, the affinity of BCIII to these sodium channels is relatively low in comparison with other toxins in the same family such as ATX-II and AFT-II.

Table 1: The affinity of BcIII to different sodium channels based on EC50 data.

Mode of action 
BcIII binds to site 3 of voltage-gated sodium channels during the closed state. Therefore, it prolongs the inactivation time course. The channel remains longer in the open state before inactivating, leading to an increase in the peak amplitude of the sodium current

Moreover, BcIII acts in a voltage-dependent manner. At saturating concentrations, the rate of unbinding from receptor sites is positively correlated to the amplitude and duration of the membrane depolarization. As a result, the destabilizing effect of BcIII on sodium channels is reversible.

BcIII shows no affinity to the open state of sodium channels and has no significant effect on activation kinetics.

Toxicity 
The LD50 of BcIII in mice is 600 μg/kg.

References

External links 
 BcIII on NCBI
 Q7M425: BcIII on UniProt
 3D Structure of BcIII based on SWISS-MODEL.

Ion channel toxins
Neurotoxins
Sea anemone toxins